Biuret is a chemical compound with the chemical formula . It is a white solid that is soluble in hot water. A variety of organic derivatives are known. The term "biuret" also describes a family of organic compounds with the chemical formula , where  are hydrogen, organyl or other groups. Also known as carbamylurea, it results from the condensation of two equivalents of urea. As such, it is an undesirable impurity in urea-based fertilizers. As biuret is toxic to plants, its percentage in fertilizers must be kept low.

Preparation and structure
The parent compound can be prepared by heating urea at 150 °C for ~6 hours until it gets slightly cloudy, then recrystallizing from water. After that, it can be recrystallized repeatedly from 2% sodium hydroxide solution and water to finally get base-free crystalline needles of the monohydrate which are free of cyanuric acid. While heating, a lot of ammonia is expelled:

Under related conditions, pyrolysis of urea affords triuret .
In general, organic biurets (those with alkyl or aryl groups in place of one or more H atoms) are prepared by trimerization of isocyanates. For example, the trimer of 1,6-hexamethylene diisocyanate is also known as HDI-biuret.

In the anhydrous form, the molecule is planar and unsymmetrical in the solid state owing to intramolecular hydrogen bonding. The terminal C–N distances of 1.327 and 1.334 Å are shorter than the internal C–N distances of 1.379 and 1.391 Å. The C=O bond distances 1.247 and 1.237 Å. It crystallizes from water as the monohydrate.

Applications
Biuret is also used as a non-protein nitrogen source in ruminant feed, where it is converted into protein by gut microorganisms. It is less favored than urea, due to its higher cost and lower digestibility but the latter characteristic also slows down its digestion and so decreases the risk of ammonia toxicity.

Biuret test
The biuret test is a chemical test for proteins and polypeptides. It is based on the biuret reagent, a blue solution that turns violet upon contact with proteins, or any substance with peptide bonds. The test and reagent do not actually contain biuret; they are so named because both biuret and proteins have the same response to the test.

History
Biuret was first prepared and studied by Gustav Heinrich Wiedemann (1826 – 1899) for his doctoral dissertation, which was submitted in 1847. His findings were reported in several articles.

Related compounds
 Cyanuric acid
 Allophanic acid, the carboxylic acid derivative of biuret

References

Ureas
Functional groups